Harry Potter and the Prisoner of Azkaban (Original Motion Picture Soundtrack) is the film score for the 2004 film of the same name, the third and final score in the series to be composed and conducted by John Williams. The score was performed by the London Symphony Orchestra with orchestrations provided by Conrad Pope and Eddie Karam. The soundtrack is a significant departure from the previous two, since the director, Alfonso Cuarón, wanted the music to take a different approach. It introduced two major themes: "Window to the Past" and "Double Trouble". Two other notable themes were used to represent the Time-Turner and Sirius Black's hunt for Harry. The soundtrack was performed at Abbey Road Studios in London. It was released on 25 May 2004 and charted at No. 68 on the Billboard 200 and also charted at No. 3 on the Top Soundtracks Chart.

The album was nominated for the Academy Award for Best Original Score, the Grammy Award for Best Score Soundtrack for Visual Media, and the World Soundtrack Award for Best Original Score of the Year. In 2018, the soundtrack was released by La-La-Land Records as a 2-Disc CD set encompassing the complete score of the film as part of a limited edition box set featuring the scores for the first three Harry Potter films.

Track listing

Harry Potter - The John Williams Soundtrack Collection: Disc 6

Harry Potter - The John Williams Soundtrack Collection: Disc 7

Track details

Lumos! (Hedwig's Theme)
This is the final movie in the Harry Potter series to use Hedwig's Theme in its original, gradually building form during the opening (until the credits of Deathly Hallows Part 2). This includes a slightly more ominous celeste melody, and retains the flute melody, but features a short harp motif at the end.

"Double Trouble"
"Double Trouble" was composed by John Williams during the film's production since he felt it to be a warm welcome back to Hogwarts. The song was sung by the London Oratory School Schola, and its lyrics are taken directly from William Shakespeare's Macbeth, in which they are spoken by three witches.

"Forward to Time Past"
"Forward to Time Past" is heard when Hermione and Harry use the Time-Turner to go back in time. During the whole piece a ticking sound is heard, indicating that time is running out. Loads of flourishing strings overlap the four-note motif that the brass repeats rhythmically, and lastly, the little bursts of woodwind throughout enforce the sensation of movement.

"The Dementors Converge"
"The Dementors Converge" is heard when Harry is attempting to save Sirius Black from the Dementors. The piece mainly consists of discordant wavering strings at the beginning, but as it progresses, Williams weaves punctuating piccolos and long notes of brass that gradually build up the menacing tension. This rises to a climax where thunderous clusters of timpani and hair-raising choir are introduced only to die back down, followed by an atmospheric flutter from the harp. The strings then lead into another extremity that uses bits and pieces from Williams' "The Patronus Light", interjected by harsh grating brass. The music appears to die off again instantly; however, the familiar sound of lush strings and celesta (so prominent in Williams' earlier scores for these films) subdue the tension afore.

Responses and ratings
The album was well received among film music critics. Archie Watt of MovieCues highly praised the score, calling it "One of the best albums of 2004, and well worth a listen by any film music or John Williams fan."

References

03
Harry Potter 3
2000s film soundtrack albums
2004 soundtrack albums
Nonesuch Records soundtracks
Atlantic Records soundtracks
Warner Records soundtracks
La-La Land Records soundtracks
Fantasy film soundtracks